Islamic Secondary School Dr. Ahmed Smajlovic is a private secondary school (gymnasium) situated in Zagreb, Croatia. Islamic Secondary School Dr. Ahmed Smajlović carries the educational programs of general secondary school direction. Classes are taught in Croatian language.

See also
Gymnasium (school)
Secondary Education
Education in Croatia
Bosniaks of Croatia
Islam in Croatia
Kantakuzina Katarina Branković Serbian Orthodox Secondary School
Italian Secondary School in Rijeka

References

Islam in Croatia
Schools in Croatia
Education in Zagreb
Secondary schools in Croatia
Minority schools
Educational institutions established in 2007
Private schools in Croatia
Islamic secondary schools in Europe
Islamic schools
Islamic education
Bosniaks of Croatia
Gymnasiums in Croatia
Religious schools in Croatia
2007 establishments in Croatia